The Vepsian Upland is a hilly region of the East European Plain located in Vologda Oblast and Leningrad Oblast, Russia. Lake Onega is located to the north.

A  forested sector at the western end of the hills is a protected area under the name Vepsian Forest. It was established in 1999. Lake Shimozero, located in the eastern part of the Vepsian Upland, is also a protected area since 1978.

Geography
The Vepsian hilly area is a northward extension of the Central Russian Upland, in the same manner as the Valdai Hills to the southeast. The south-west / northeast oriented Tikhvin Ridge connects the central part of the Valdai Hills to the Vepsian Upland in its north-eastern part. Together with the Tikhvin Ridge, part of the Valdai Hills, the Vepsian Upland separates the basins of the Baltic and the Caspian Seas.
 
The upland stretches across Vytegorsky District, in the western part of Vologda Oblast, as well as the Podporozhsky, Boksitogorsky and Tikhvinsky districts of the eastern side of Leningrad Oblast.

The main rivers of the hill area are the Shoksha, Oyat, Kapsha, Pasha, Tutoka and Yavosma.

See also
Highest points of Russian Federal subjects
List of mountains and hills of Russia
Vepsians § Geography

References

External links
Вепсский лес / Vepsian forest
Veps Hills
Aiding around Vepsia

Landforms of Leningrad Oblast
Landforms of Vologda Oblast